Rushaniya Safina (born 25 November 1993) is an Uzbekistani footballer who plays as a midfielder for Women's Championship club Sevinch and the Uzbekistan women's national team.

International goals
Scores and results list Uzbekistan's goal tally first

See also
List of Uzbekistan women's international footballers

References 

1993 births
Living people
Women's association football midfielders
Uzbekistani women's footballers
People from Fergana Region
Uzbekistan women's international footballers
Uzbekistani women's futsal players
21st-century Uzbekistani women